Davis MacLean, portrayed by Method Man, is a fictional character from the Starz television series Power Book II: Ghost, a sequel and spin-off to Power, he is one of the main characters within the series and a criminal defense attorney mainly for Tariq St. Patrick (Michael Rainey Jr.) in season 1 and season 2 prior were he forged an alliance with Cooper Saxe (Shane Johnson).

After managing to keep Tasha St. Patrick (Naturi Naughton) and Tariq out of jail after Tariq was indicted for the murder of his father, James "Ghost" St. Patrick (Omari Hardwick), and also keeping Tasha out Tommy Egan's (Joseph Sikora) harms way, he went on partner with Cooper Saxe (if not recruiting him to his firm) whom he was opposed by.

Short description 
Davis MacLean is in possession of a calm, calculating and resolute personality. He is highly prominent for being the most expensive 'non-losing' defense attorney. Apparently MacLean has a brother (Theo Rollins, portrayed by Redman) whose diagnosed with terminal illness in prison, however MacLean seems to be doing everything in his power to get his brother out of prison before he meets his demise.

Concept and creation

References

External links 
 
 

 

 

Fictional lawyers
Fictional African-American people
Television characters introduced in 2020